= Pierce, Butler and Pierce Manufacturing Company =

American bath hardware and heating manufacturer

Pierce, Butler & Pierce Manufacturing Company
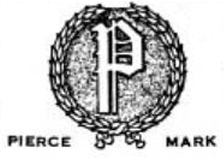
- Company type: Bath hardware and heating
- Industry: Bath hardware and heating
- Founded: 1839
- Founder: Sylvester Phineas Pierce
- Defunct: 193x
- Fate: Bankrupt
- Headquarters: Syracuse, New York, United States
- Area served: United States
- Products: Bathtubs, lavatories, water closets
- Revenue: $5,000,000
- Owner: Sylvester Phineas Pierce and his son William Kasson Pierce
- Subsidiaries: Catchpole Manufacturing Company

Pierce, Butler & Pierce Manufacturing Company (1839-193x) was a manufacturer of "heating and sanitary goods" for the bathroom in Syracuse, New York. The company was founded by Sylvester Phineas Pierce and his son, William Kasson Pierce, was president of the firm from 1893 to 1914.
